The second season of the Kannada-language version of Indian reality television series Bigg Boss was telecast on Asianet Suvarna and produced by Endemol India. The show premiered on 29 June 2014 with Sudeep as the host.

Among four finalists Akul Balaji emerged as the title winner with maximum votes and performance in house followed by Srujan Lokesh as runner-up, Deepika Kamaiah and Shwetha Chengappa as third and fourth respectively

Housemates status

Housemates

Original entrants
Adi Lokesh, son of late Mysore Lokesh, is known for his villain roles in Kannada film industry.
Akul Balaji is a host of Kannada reality shows, Thaka Dhimi Tha Dancing Star (2014) being the most recent. Akul Balaji currently the winner of Bigg Boss Kannada Season 2.
Anita Bhat Prabhakar Mandya
Anupama Bhat anchored morning show and Kitchen Taare on (Udaya TV) and was a contestant in Thaka Dhimi Tha Dancing Star.
Deepika Kamaiah is a Kannada actress notable for a leading role in the 2012 movie Chingari along with Darshan Thoogudeep.
Harshika Poonacha is a Kannada actress notable for roles in movies Thamassu, Jackie and Mangana Kaili Maanikya.
Laya Kokila, elder brother of Sadhu Kokila, is cast as a comedian in the movies Devarane (2013) and Rangappa Hogbitna.
Mayur Patel is an actor since 2000. Some of his movies are Mani (2003), Gunna (2005), Udees (2005), Muniya (2009), Hunja (2010) and Slum (2013).
Neethu Shetty is an actress from Mangalore who appeared in movies like Jokefalls, Gaalipata and Manasaare.
Rohith Patel is a RJ of FM show No tension on BIG FM 92.7.
Santhosh Aryan is an actor who had played a lead role in movies like Nooru Janumaku (2010), Abhiram (2010) and Ishta (2014).actor
Shakeela is a film actress and glamour model. She is also seen in comic roles in several South Indian films.
Srujan Lokesh, son of late Lokesh and Girija Lokesh, is an actor and a popular host of TV programs Maja With Sruja (Suvarna TV), Chota Champion (Zee Kannada), "Maja Talkies" (Colors Kannada) and currently "Comedy Talkies" (Colors Kannada)
Swetha Changappa is a  Kannada telesoap actress who became a household name by her role of Kadambari in Kannada soap Kadambari.She also hosted TV shows Yaariguntu Yaarigilla and Kuniyonu Baara on Zee Kannada. She also acted in ETV Kannada's serials Arundhati and Sukanya.

Wild card entries

Guruprasad

Guruprasad is a director of hit movies Mata, Eddelu Manjunatha and Director's Special. He was a judge for the dance reality show Thaka Dhimi Tha Dancing Star (2014).Presently he is hosting Life Super Guru in Zee Kannada. Guruprasad's stay in Bigg Boss has been controversial, marred by his inability to get along with the other contestants.

Guests

Bullet Prakash

Prakash is well known as Bullet Prakash. He is a famous comedian in Kannada industry. He had acted with many legend actors like Ravichandran, Sudeep, Sadhu Kokila etc.

Episodes
The episodes were broadcast by Asianet Suvarna channel at a time slot of 8 to 9 pm daily.

Daily summary

Nominations table

Notes

: Housemates were asked to pair and participate in the nomination process.
: Harshika (Special rights) chose Shakeela to be deprived from voting rights.
: Akul (House captain) chose Santhosh to be safe from eviction.
: Guruprasad entered the house after the weeks' nomination process.
: Neethu moved to secret room instead of being evicted.
: Harshika (Special rights) chose Srujan, Anupama, Swetha and Mayur to face nomination (others were safe). 
: House captain Rohith's nomination was counted as 2 votes.
: No elimination week.
: Shweta (House captain) chose Guruprasad to be deprived from voting rights.
: All housemates except the captain were nominated for eviction by Bigg Boss. 
: Housemates were asked to take two names who does not deserve to win the Bigg Boss title. 
: Twist - Anupama, Santhosh and Rohith were directly nominated for the remaining weeks and were not eligible for captainship. 
: Twist - Housemates' family members were asked to nominate. 
: Open nominations, held at living area.

Marketing and sponsors

Production: The channel claims that 14 contestants (initially) will compete for a cash prize of   50 lakhs and the show will last 100 episodes. The amount for retaining host Sudeep is about Rs 1.5 crores to Rs 2.5 crores Sources estimate that the production cost of the show is about Rs 16 crores to Rs 17 crores across the 100 episodes, with the total cost pegged at around Rs 30 lakh to Rs 35 lakh.

Sponsors: the show has OLX.in as title sponsor, CERA as the powered sponsor, and Dollar Bigg Boss as associate sponsor.

Marketing: Advertising was purchased on buses, hoardings, FM stations, multiplex, and print media. The channel is promoting the show on the digital platform like websites and social networking..The entire digital marketing, website, social media and online-voting was handled by Fuego Systems

Promotion: Promos, ads, and special programs on Suvarna TV's sister channels Suvarna Plus and Suvarna News were aired to promote the show.

References

External links

Bigg Boss Kannada
2014 Indian television seasons
Star Suvarna original programming
Kannada-language television shows